The following is a list of monarchs of the Kingdom of Desmond. Most were of the MacCarthy Mór ("great MacCarthy"), the senior branch of the MacCarthy dynasty.

12th century

MacCarthy

MacCarthy claimants

O'Brien claimants

MacCarthy

13th century

14th century

15th century

16th century

Claim I

Claim II

Final

Later MacCarthy Mór chiefs
The title Chief of the Name MacCarthy Mór, heir of the historical chief, was claimed by Terence Francis MacCarthy and recognised in 1992 by the Chief Herald of Ireland. In 1999 recognition was withdrawn after it emerged that evidence for the claim had been fabricated. 

In June 2009, Liam Trant MacCarthy (born 27 December 1957) of Southern Rhodesia received recognition from Garter Principal King of Arms at the College of Arms in London as the senior descendant and claimant to the title MacCarthy Mór. He is the son of Cormac Trant McCarthy (1931-1999), the son of William, otherwise Liam, Trant McCarthy, Solicitor (1894-1967), the son of William Patrick Trant McCarthy (1853-1901), the son of Daniel McCarthy of Srugrena and his wife Ellen, the daughter of Patrick Trant of Waterford. The top two generations of this pedigree appear on a pedigree in the former Ulster Office of Arms. The family pedigree was also published in  Burke's Irish Landed Gentry under the heading MacCarthy of Srugrena Abbey Co. Kerry.

References

See also
Earl of Clancarty
Earl of Desmond
Eóganachta
FitzGerald dynasty
Kings of Munster
MacCarthy of Muskerry
MacCarthy Reagh

Munster
History of County Cork
History of County Kerry
 
MacCarthy dynasty